Zinc finger protein 2 is a protein that in humans is encoded by the ZNF2 gene.

Function

The protein encoded by this gene belongs to the C2H2-type zinc-finger protein family. The exact function of this gene is not known, however, zinc-finger proteins are known to interact with DNA and function as transcription regulators. Alternatively spliced transcript variants encoding different isoforms have been found for this gene.

References

Further reading